Rekka Katti Parakkudhu Manasu is an Indian Tamil soap opera starring Siddharth and Sameera. Zee Tamil broadcast this series from 19 June 2017.

The show is produced by Syed Anwar and Sameera Sherief, and is a remake of the Marathi language television series Tujhyat Jeev Rangala which is airing on Zee Marathi from October 2016.

Plot
The show story of is the love story of farmer and wrestler Tamizh (Siddharth) and highly educated school teacher Malar (Sameera) who has recently moved to the village. Their difference in mindset, upbringing and lifestyle makes their love story sweet and complicated at the same time.

Cast
Main
 Siddharth Kumaran as Tamizhselvan aka Tamizh (Main male protagonist)
 Sameera Sherief as Malar Tamizhselvan. (Tamizh's wife, Main female protagonist) and Priyanka (Antagonist) - Dual role
 Syed Anwar Ahmed as Arunachalam aka Arun
 Sai Swetha \ Nirajani Ashok as Divya
 Geetha Saraswathi as Arun's Mother

Tamilzh`s Family
 Vadivukkarasi (episodes 1 to 36) and Shanthi Williams(episode 41 onwards)  as Thayaramma (nanny of Tamizh and Shakthi) 
 Ashwin Karthik as Shakthi (Tamizh's younger brother)
 Vandana Michael (episodes 1 to 237) and Nisha (episode 238 onwards) as Nandini (Shakthi's wife, Main antagonist)
 Jayaraj as Kumaresan 
 Sheela as Dhanalakshmi (Tamizh's mother)

Malar's Family
 K Sankaranarayan as Vishwanathan (Malar's father)
 Srilatha as Dhanalakshmi (Malar's mother)

Supporting Characters 
 Renu Soundar and Rhema as Valli
 K. Natraj as Arun's grandfather
 Ragavi Renu as Kayal (Malar's best friend)
 Deepa as Ganga (Nandini's maid)
 Vijayalakshmi as Nandini's mother
 Arivu Azhagan as (Tamizh's best friend)
 Karthi
 -- as Ashan
 -- as Mari
 B. Nilani

Special appearance
 Sanjeev and akshitha bopiah

Adaptations

Awards and nominations

References

External links
 

Zee Tamil original programming
Tamil-language romance television series
2017 Tamil-language television series debuts
Tamil-language television shows
2019 Tamil-language television series endings
Tamil-language television series based on Marathi-language television series